Markovićevo is a village in Serbia. It is situated in the Plandište municipality, South Banat District, Vojvodina province.

Name
Older Serbian name for the village was Kriva Bara (Крива Бара). In Hungarian the village is known as Torontálújfalu (Formerly also Ujfalu and Torontal-Ujfalu). In Romanian, the name is Crivobara; the village was in the Kingdom of Romania until 1923.

Demographics
The village has a Serb ethnic majority (70,37%) with a sizable Hungarian minority (21,29%) and its population numbering 216 people (2002 census).

Historical population

1961: 505
1971: 420
1981: 310
1991: 239
2002: 216

See also
List of places in Serbia
List of cities, towns and villages in Vojvodina

References
Slobodan Ćurčić, Broj stanovnika Vojvodine, Novi Sad, 1996.

External links
Municipalities of Vojvodina

Populated places in Serbian Banat
Populated places in South Banat District
Plandište